The galaxy cluster IRC 0218 (also known as XMM-LSS J02182−05102) hosts the most distant strong gravitational lensing galaxy currently known at a redshift of z = 1.62.  The lens is one of the two brightest cluster galaxies and is lensing a background star-forming galaxy at a redshift of z = 2.26 into a bright arc and a faint counterimage.  The lens was discovered through a combination of Hubble Space Telescope and Keck telescope imaging and spectroscopy.  The discovery and subsequent analysis of the lens was published in the Astrophysical Journal Letters on June 23, 2014 by an international team of astronomers led by Dr. Kim-Vy Tran from Texas A&M University in College Station, Texas and team members Dr. Kenneth Wong and Dr. Sherry Suyu from the Academia Sinica Institute of Astronomy and Astrophysics in Taipei, Taiwan.

The coordinates of the lens are 02h18m21.5s -05d10m19.9s.

References 

Gravitational lensing
Galaxy clusters
Cetus (constellation)